Shehryar Shehzadi is Pakistani television drama series which was originally shown on the Urdu 1 and A-Plus Entertainment channels. This drama is a Mastermind Production, directed by Syed Ahmed Kamran and written by Zafar Imran.
In an interview, Saba Qamar said that Sarwat, the role she played, was one of her favourite roles ever, since being a perfect believer in Allah was very special for her.

Plot 
A real-life story of an innocent prostitute (Tawaif) girl Sarwat, born in the center of immorality but her belief in worshiping God turns her world around. By the end of story, every evil character will repent for their bad deeds and truth shall prevail.

Cast 
 Saba Qamar as Sarwat
Faizan Khawaja  as Imran
 Imran Aslam as Jibraan
Farah Shah  as Shaista, Sanam's mother
Nayyar Ijaz as Nazeer
Manzoor Qureshi
Gohar Rasheed as Asad
 Soniya Hussain as Sanam
 Waseem Abbas as Sarwat's father
Rashid Farooqui
Nausheen Shah

References

External links 
Urdu1 Official website
 

Pakistani drama television series
Urdu-language television shows
Urdu 1 original programming
A-Plus TV original programming
Zee Zindagi original programming